Fort Beschutter ( Beshshatar Balakotuwa) or Fort Pass Beschutter (Beshshatar Pas Balakotuwa) was a small fort, which was linearly located between Elephant Pass Fort and Fort Pass Pyl in the narrow part of the Jaffna peninsula. The strategic fort was used to protect Jaffna peninsula from the forces of mainland (Vanniyas and Sinhalese) as well as illegal access, smuggling, etc.

Fort Beschutter was built as square-shaped fort like other two in the Elephant Pass area. It was destroyed and nothing found today.

References

External links 
 Fort Pyl & Fort Beschutter

Beschutter
Beschutter